The white-faced robin (Tregellasia leucops) is a species of bird in the family Petroicidae.
It is found in New Guinea and eastern Cape York Peninsula.
Its natural habitats are subtropical or tropical moist lowland forest and subtropical or tropical moist montane forest.

References

External links

white-faced robin
Birds of New Guinea
Birds of Cape York Peninsula
white-faced robin
Taxonomy articles created by Polbot